Rockland Coaches Inc., also known as The Red and Tan Lines, is a commuter coach company owned by Coach USA based in Westwood, New Jersey, United States, that operates commuter bus service between New York City and points in Bergen County, New Jersey and Rockland County, New York, and provides local bus service in both locales north of Route 46. Coach USA acquired the company in 1997.

Routes

Interstate service 
Between Bergen and Rockland Counties, and New York City, Rockland Coaches provides service along ten routes.

Route ends are given for each route except for branching. Some trips may only serve a portion of the route.

Fleet
Rockland Coaches' fleet consists of exclusively NJT-owned MCI coach buses. The fleet consisted of older MC-series coaches, which were replaced with D4000 and D4500 coaches in the early 2000s. From 2019 to 2021, Rockland Coaches received brand-new D4500CT coaches to gradually replace the older D4000 and D4500 coaches.

All buses owned by New Jersey Transit. Only units originally allocated to Rockland Coaches are shown.

Former routes 
Rockland Coaches operated Transport of Rockland from 1976 to 2013, when it lost the contract.

References

External links 

Surface transportation in Greater New York
Stagecoach Group bus operators in the United States and Canada
Bus transportation in New Jersey
Bus transportation in New York (state)
Transport companies established in 1917
Transportation in Bergen County, New Jersey
Transportation in Rockland County, New York
Bus companies of the United States
1917 establishments in New Jersey
Transportation companies based in New Jersey